Wells Fargo Center, formerly the Wachovia Center, is a  high rise in Tampa, Florida, U.S.A., anchored by Wells Fargo & Company, Phelps Dunbar and UBS. It was completed in 1985 and has 22 floors. Under new ownership in 2013, the building is undergoing a renovation of the fitness center, parking garage and common areas including the restrooms and corridors. The building received Gold LEED certification in 2010. It was originally known as First Union Plaza until First Union Corporation completed its merger into Wachovia in 1993, then that merged into Wells Fargo in 2008. It is the 13th tallest building in Tampa.

See also
List of tallest buildings in Tampa
 Downtown Tampa

References

Skyscraper office buildings in Tampa, Florida
Office buildings completed in 1985
Wells Fargo buildings
1985 establishments in Florida